Kennedy Rose was an American country music duo composed of singer-songwriters Mary Ann Kennedy and Pam Rose. Both members of the duo previously recorded in the all-women band Calamity Jane on Columbia Records in the 1980s. After splitting from the band, Kennedy and Rose founded the duo and signed to I.R.S. Records. As Kennedy Rose, they released two albums for the label: hai ku in 1989 and Walk the Line in 1994. Following the release of hai ku, the duo toured with Sting. Kennedy and Rose have also written hit singles for Restless Heart ("I'll Still Be Loving You"), Lee Greenwood ("Ring on her Finger, Time on Her Hands", later covered by Reba McEntire), Patty Loveless ("You Will") and Martina McBride ("Safe in the Arms of Love", also recorded by Baillie and the Boys and Michelle Wright).

Discography

Albums

Singles

References

American country music groups
Country music duos
Musical groups established in 1989